Brownsville Independent School District is a school district based in Brownsville, Texas, United States.

BISD serves most of the city of Brownsville and a portion of the town of Rancho Viejo as well as unincorporated areas in Cameron County, including Cameron Park, Reid Hope King, San Pedro, South Point, and Villa Pancho.  It is the largest school district in the Rio Grande Valley metropolitan area.

BISD won the 2008 Broad Prize for Urban Education, the largest school district award in the country, based on improving student performance, closing achievement gaps, and strong district-wide policies.

In 2009, the school district was rated "academically acceptable" by the Texas Education Agency.

Schools

High schools 
James Pace High School
Lopez High School
Gladys Porter High School
Simon Rivera High School
Homer Hanna High School
Veterans Memorial High School
Brownsville Early College High School

Middle schools 
Maytee Gentry Stell Middle School
Raul A. Besteiro Jr. Middle School
Harry Lee Faulk Middle School
Dr. Juliet V. Garcia Middle School
Senator Eddie A. Lucio Jr. Middle School
Dr. Arnulfo Oliveira Middle School
Louise C. Perkins Middle School
Charles Stillman Middle School
Judge Filemón B. Vela Middle School
Edward Manzano Jr. Middle School

Elementary schools
Daniel Breeden Elementary School
Garden Park Elementary School
Bruce T. Aiken Elementary School
A.X. Benavides Elementary School
Ben L. Brite Elementary School
Marilyn E. Burns Elementary School
J.T. (José Tomás) Canales Elementary School
Josephine Castañeda Elementary School
A.A. Champion Elementary School
Cromack Elementary School
Rosita Del Castillo Elementary School
Égly Elementary School
El Jardin Elementary School
Dr. Ruben Gallegos Elementary School
Judge Reynaldo G. Garza Elementary School
Mariano Gonzalez Sr. Elementary School
Hubert R. Hudson Elementary School
Reynaldo Longoria Elementary School
Robert L. Martin Elementary School
Mittie A. Pullam Elementary School
Morningside Elementary School
Congressman Solomon P. Ortiz Elementary School
Palm Grove Elementary School
Dr. Américo Paredes Elementary School
Felipe R. Perez Elementary School
Annie S. Putegnat Elementary School
Resaca Elementary School
Emaline B. Russell Elementary School
Gertrude M. Sharp Elementary School
Lucille B. Skinner Elementary School
Southmost Elementary School
Vermillion Road Elementary School
Victoria Heights Elementary School
Villa Nueva Elementary School
Mary & Frank Yturria Elementary School

Alternative schools
Brownsville Academic Center
Brownsville Learning Academy
Lincoln Park School
Regional School for the Deaf

External links

Brownsville Independent School District

References

School districts in Cameron County, Texas
Education in Brownsville, Texas